Tanner Scott Rainey (born December 25, 1992) is an American professional baseball pitcher for the Washington Nationals of Major League Baseball (MLB). He was drafted by the Cincinnati Reds in the second round of the 2015 Major League Baseball draft. He made his MLB debut with the Reds in 2018.

Career
Rainey attended St. Paul's School in Covington, Louisiana. He played college baseball at Southeastern Louisiana University and the University of West Alabama as a pitcher and first baseman. He was drafted by the Cincinnati Reds as a pitcher in the second round of the 2015 Major League Baseball draft.

Cincinnati Reds
Rainey signed with the Reds, made his professional debut with the Billings Mustangs, and spent the whole season there, pitching to a 2-2 record and 4.27 ERA in 15 starts. He pitched 2016 with the Dayton Dragons and was 5-10 with a 5.57 ERA in 29 games (20 starts), and 2017 with the Daytona Tortugas and Pensacola Blue Wahoos, compiling a combined 3-3 record and 3.19 ERA in 53 relief appearances along with 104 strikeouts in 62 innings (15.1 per nine innings). The Reds invited him to spring training in 2018.

On April 10, 2018, Rainey's contract was purchased by the Reds. He made his major league debut that same day against the Philadelphia Phillies, pitching one inning of relief and giving up a grand slam to Scott Kingery.

Washington Nationals
On December 12, 2018, the Reds traded Rainey to the Washington Nationals for Tanner Roark. Rainey was called up to the Nationals from the Triple-A Fresno Grizzlies on May 18, 2019, and swiftly became one of manager Dave Martinez's go-to relievers. He earned his first career win in relief on June 1, beating Roark and the Reds at Great American Ball Park. In 2019 he was 2-3 with a 3.91 ERA in 52 relief appearances, as he struck out 74 batters in 48.1 innings (13.8 per nine innings). The Nationals finished the 2019 year with a 93-69 record, clinched a wild card spot, and won the World Series over the Houston Astros. Rainey pitched 6.2 innings in the 2019 playoffs including throwing 2 strikeouts and finishing Game 3 of the 2019 NLCS, the first ever NLCS game at Nationals Park and in Washington, DC history. Rainey pitched 20.1 innings of 2.66 ERA ball in 2020, going along with 32 strikeouts and a 1-1 record, however after experiencing forearm tightness in mid-September 2020, Rainey sat out the remainder of the season. In 2021, Rainey made 38 appearances for the Nationals, but struggled immensely to the tune of a 1-3 record and 7.39 ERA with 42 strikeouts in 31.2 innings pitched. 

He improved his numbers in 2022, pitching in 29 games and recording a 3.30 ERA with 12 saves and 36 strikeouts in 30.0 innings of work. On July 13, 2022, Rainey was abruptly placed on the 60-day injured list with a sprain of his ulnar collateral ligament in his right elbow. On August 3, he underwent Tommy John surgery, ending his season.

References

External links

1992 births
Living people
Sportspeople from Hammond, Louisiana
Baseball players from Louisiana
Major League Baseball pitchers
Cincinnati Reds players
Washington Nationals players
Southeastern Louisiana Lions baseball players
West Alabama Tigers baseball players
Billings Mustangs players
Dayton Dragons players
Daytona Tortugas players
Pensacola Blue Wahoos players
Louisville Bats players
Fresno Grizzlies players